Yves Carignan (born 7 September 1952) is a Canadian weightlifter. He competed in the men's bantamweight event at the 1976 Summer Olympics.

References

1952 births
Living people
Canadian male weightlifters
Olympic weightlifters of Canada
Weightlifters at the 1976 Summer Olympics
Sportspeople from Quebec
Commonwealth Games medallists in weightlifting
Commonwealth Games silver medallists for Canada
Weightlifters at the 1974 British Commonwealth Games
20th-century Canadian people
21st-century Canadian people
Medallists at the 1974 British Commonwealth Games